The 1932 French Championships (now known as the French Open) was a tennis tournament that took place on the outdoor clay ourts at the Stade Roland-Garros in Paris, France. The tournament ran from 22 May until 6 June. It was the 37th staging of the French Championships and the second Grand Slam tournament of the year.

Henri Cochet and Helen Wills Moody won their final French Championships. For Cochet, it was his fifth win, for Wills Moody, her fourth.

Finals

Men's singles

 Henri Cochet (FRA) defeated  Giorgio de Stefani (ITA), 6–0, 6–4, 4–6, 6–3

Women's singles

 Helen Wills Moody (USA) defeated  Simonne Mathieu (FRA) 7–5, 6–1

Men's doubles
 Henri Cochet (FRA) /  Jacques Brugnon (FRA) defeated  Christian Boussus (FRA) /  Marcel Bernard (FRA) 6–4, 3–6, 7–5, 6–3

Women's doubles
 Helen Wills Moody (USA) /  Elizabeth Ryan (USA) defeated  Betty Nuthall (GBR) /  Eileen Bennett Whittingstall (GBR) 6–1, 6–3

Mixed doubles
 Betty Nuthall (GBR) /  Fred Perry (GBR) defeated  Helen Wills Moody (USA) /  Sidney Wood (USA) 6–4, 6–2

References

External links
 French Open official website

French Championships
French Championships (tennis) by year
French Champ
May 1932 sports events
June 1932 sports events
1932 in Paris